Franz Xaver Strasser (10 September 1899 – 10 December 1945) was an Austrian-German Nazi Party Kreisleiter (district leader) and war criminal. Strasser was the first war criminal to be judged at the Dachau trials.

Action
On 9 December 1944, in Kaplice in the Protectorate of Bohemia and Moravia (present-day Czech Republic), Franz Strasser killed two American airmen of the USAAF by shooting them with a Thompson submachine gun. They were members of a group of five airmen of the 20th Bomb Squadron who stayed with pilot Woodruff Warren when he landed their plane in a field. They had voluntarily surrendered and were taken away in a truck, accompanied by Strasser and Captain Karl Lindemeyer, the chief of police of the city. During Strasser's trial, evidence showed that Lindemeyer had killed three or four of the airmen, and the verdict suggested the murders were originally Lindemeyer's idea.

The five men killed:

 Woodruff J. Warren of Maryland
 Donald L. Hart of Massachusetts
 Frank Pinto Jr. of Texas
 George D. Mayott of New York
 Joseph Cox of Alabama

Arrest, trial, and execution

After Germany's surrender, U.S. Army officials sought four men for their involvement in the shootings: Strasser and Lindemeyer, and Hermann Nelböck and Walter Wolf, both of whom had accompanied Strasser on the drive to where the airmen were shot. Strasser was arrested in June 1945. Neither Nelböck nor Wolf were ever apprehended, albeit the court in Strasser's trial concluded they had no involvements in the actual murders. Lindemeyer could not be tried since he killed himself on 8 May 1945.

On 24 August 1945, Strasser was tried by a U.S. military court in Dachau, which provided a translator for him during the trial. He was found guilty of committing war crimes and was sentenced to death by hanging. On 10 December 1945, Strasser was hanged at Landsberg Prison.

References

1899 births
1945 deaths
Austrian mass murderers
Massacres in 1944
Nazi war crimes in Czechoslovakia
Executed Austrian Nazis

Dachau trials executions
Perpetrators of World War II prisoner of war massacres
Executed mass murderers